Paraguay competed at the 1984 Summer Olympics in Los Angeles, United States.  The nation returned to the Olympic Games after participating in the American-led boycott of the 1980 Summer Olympics.

Athletics

Key
Note–Ranks given for track events are within the athlete's heat only
Q = Qualified for the next round
q = Qualified for the next round as a fastest loser or, in field events, by position without achieving the qualifying target
NR = National record
N/A = Round not applicable for the event
Bye = Athlete not required to compete in round

Men
Track & road events

Field

Combined Events

Boxing

Judo

Shooting

See also
Paraguay at the 1983 Pan American Games

References
sports-reference
Official Olympic Reports

Nations at the 1984 Summer Olympics
1984
Olympics